Gopi Amarnath is an Indian cinematographer, who works in the Tamil film industry.

Career
Gopi studied in MGR Film Institute and started to work as an assistant to ace cinematographer, P. S. Vinod.
Amarnath received positive reviews for his work in Maalai Pozhudhin Mayakathilaey (2012), and was thus signed up by C. V. Kumar to collaborate on another venture. His work in Karthik Subbaraj's directorial debut Pizza (2012), won him critical acclaim and the Vijay Award for Best Cinematographer. He subsequently received a breakthrough and began working on bigger budget productions, teaming up with Sundar C for Theeya Velai Seiyyanum Kumaru (2013) and Aambala (2015). 
As of 2015, he has five films in various stages of production.

Filmography

As cinematographer
 Potta Potti (2011)
 Maalai Pozhudhin Mayakathilaey (2012)
 Pizza (2012)
 Theeya Velai Seiyyanum Kumaru (2013)
 Irumbu Kuthirai (2014)
 Aambala (2015)
 Enakkul Oruvan (2015)
 Yatchan (2015)
 Pencil (2016)
 Maayavan (2016)
 Semma Botha Aagathey (2018)
 Thamizh Padam 2.0 (2018)
 Vantha Rajavathaan Varuven (2019)
 Vasantha Mullai

References

External links
 
  https://twitter.com/AmarnathGopi at Twitter

Living people
People from Tirunelveli district
Cinematographers from Tamil Nadu
Tamil film cinematographers
Year of birth missing (living people)